The D101/102 Beijing-Harbin Through Train is Chinese railway running between the capital Beijing to Harbin, capital of Heilongjiang express passenger trains by the Shenyang Railway Bureau, Harbin passenger segment responsible for passenger transport task, Harbin originating on the Beijing train. CRH5 Type Passenger trains running along the Jingha Railway and Harbin–Dalian High-Speed Railway across Heilongjiang, Jilin, Liaoning, Hebei, Tianjin, Beijing and other provinces and cities, the entire 1241 km. Beijing railway station to Harbin West railway station running 7 hours and 46 minutes, use trips for D101; Harbin West railway station to Beijing railway station to run 7 hours and 52 minutes, use trips for D102.

See also 
Z1/2 Beijing-Harbin Through Train
Z15/16 Beijing-Harbin Through Train
Z203/204 Beijing-Harbin Through Train
D27/28 Beijing-Harbin Through Train
G381/382 Beijing-Harbin Through Train
G393/394 Beijing-Harbin Through Train

References 

Passenger rail transport in China
Rail transport in Beijing
Rail transport in Heilongjiang